Kingsdale is a valley on the western edge of the Yorkshire Dales National Park in northern England. The name Kingsdale derives from a combination of Old Norse and Old English (Kyen and Dael) which means The valley where the cows were kept. Humans were active in Kingsdale from 6,700 BC onwards. Evidence of fire-pits used by hunter-gatherers have been found in the dale.

The larger part of the valley lies within the county of North Yorkshire but its highest reaches fall just within Cumbria. It is defined by the hills of Whernside to its east and Gragareth to its west. Kingsdale is drained by the south-westward flowing Kingsdale Beck which assumes the name River Twiss before joining the River Doe at Ingleton to become the River Greta. The single minor public road which serves the valley is followed by the Yorkshire Dales Cycle Way. There are several nationally important caves within the valley (such as Rowten Pot and Yordas Cave) and the impressive resurgence of Keld Head.

References

Sources

External links
Video of the flash flooding of one of the rivers in Kingsdale after heavy rains

Craven District
Valleys of North Yorkshire
Valleys of Cumbria
Yorkshire Dales